Elena Ruehr (born 1963, Ann Arbor) is an American musician, music educator and composer.

Life and career
Elena Ruehr's parents were a mathematician and an English professor. She grew up in Houghton, Michigan and began piano lessons at age four. She studied composition at the University of Michigan with William Bolcom and at The Juilliard School with Vincent Persichetti and Bernard Rands. She also studied dance and has performed with Javanese and West African ensembles. In 1991 Ruehr took a teaching position at MIT. Her compositions have been performed internationally and some have been recorded and available on media. Many of Ruehr's compositions involve setting poetry to music.

Ruehr is married to Seward Rutkove and they have one daughter, Sophie.

Selected works
Ruehr has composed works for orchestra, chamber ensemble, solo instruments and vocals.

Ladder to the Moon (2003) for orchestra
Toussaint Before the Spirits (2003), opera
Cloud Atlas (2011), cello concerto
Song of the Silkie (2000) for baritone, string quartet, text by Laura Harrington
Sky Above Clouds (1993) for orchestra
Bel Canto for string quartet
Averno for choir
It's About Time (2015) for chamber ensemble, commissioned by the San Francisco Contemporary Music Players

Recordings
"SHIMMER" on Metamorphosen. Metamorphosen string orchestra, Scott Yoo conducting 
"TOUSSAINT BEFORE THE SPIRTS" Stephen Salters, Baritone and Opera Unlimited, Gil Rose, conducting 
“HOW SHE DANCED”: String Quartets of Elena Ruehr Performed by the Cypress String Quartet. Cypress Performing Arts Association.
"JANE WANG CONSIDERS THE DRAGONFLY." Alexi Gonzales, Benjamin Seltzer, Sarah Brady, Heng-Jin Park, and Sarah Bob, named for insect flight expert Z. Jane Wang
"AVERNO" Marguerite Krull, Stephen Salters, The Trinity Choir, Novus NY, and Julian Wachner, conducting 
"O'KEEFFE IMAGES" Jennifer Kloetzel, Cello, and the Boston Modern Orchestra Project, Gil Rose, conducting.
"LIFT" Irina Muresanu, violin Ethan Filner, viola Jennifer Kloetzel, cello Sarah Bob, piano 
"SIX STRING QUARTETS" Cypress and Borremeo String Quartets with baritone Stephen Salters 
"FRESH PAINT” Radius Ensemble performance of Quetzal Garden

References

External links
Official composer page
Composer biography and recording of It's About Time San Francisco Contemporary Music Players

1963 births
Living people
Musicians from Ann Arbor, Michigan
20th-century classical composers
American women classical composers
American classical composers
American women music educators
University of Michigan School of Music, Theatre & Dance alumni
Juilliard School alumni
MIT School of Humanities, Arts, and Social Sciences faculty
People from Houghton, Michigan
American opera composers
Pupils of Vincent Persichetti
21st-century American composers
Women opera composers
20th-century American women musicians
20th-century American composers
21st-century American women musicians
Classical musicians from Michigan
20th-century women composers
21st-century women composers
American women academics